Bozzolo is a comune (municipality) in the Province of Mantua in the Italian region Lombardy, located about  southeast of Milan and about  southwest of Mantua.

Bozzolo borders the following municipalities: Acquanegra sul Chiese, Calvatone, Marcaria, Rivarolo Mantovano, San Martino dall'Argine, Tornata. Writer Lucrezia Gonzaga, daughter of local condottiero Pirro Gonzaga, was born here in 1522.

Notable people 

 Primo Mazzolari, (1890-1959), parson from 1932 to 1959, writer and partisan

References

External links
 Official website

Cities and towns in Lombardy